Pic a Tenerife is a mountain located in western Newfoundland, near the coastal community of Glenburnie in Gros Morne National Park. It takes its name from the island of Tenerife in Spain.

See also
 Mountain peaks of Canada

References

Pic a Tenerife